The V International Chopin Piano Competition was held from 21 February to 20 March 1955 in Warsaw. The competition was won by Adam Harasiewicz of Poland.

The competition was held in the rebuilt National Philharmonic, the date having been moved from October 1954 to February 1955, temporarily increasing the gap between two competitions to six years. Competitors were accommodated in the Hotel Polonia, where 70 practice pianos were installed.

Awards 
The competition consisted of three elimination stages, with 74, 41 and 21 pianists respectively. Vladimir Ashkenazy was considered the favorite up until the final stage, where he performed less strongly, ultimately coming in second after Adam Harasiewicz.

The following prizes were awarded:

One special prize was awarded:

Jury 
The jury consisted of:
  Guido Agosti
  Stefan Askenase
  Arturo Benedetti Michelangeli
  
  Harold Craxton  (vice-chairman)
  Zbigniew Drzewiecki (chairman)
  Jacques Février
  Flora Guerra
  Emil Hájek
  Jan Hoffman
  Louis Kentner
  Lazare Lévy
  Witold Lutosławski
  Joseph Marx
  František Maxián
  Lev Oborin (vice-chairman) ( I)
  Lyubomir Pipkov
  Bruno Seidlhofer
  Hugo Steurer
  Ma Sicong
  Stanisław Szpinalski (secretary) ( I)
  
   (substitute)
  Magda Tagliaferro (vice-chairman)
  Erik Then-Bergh
  
  Imré Ungár
  Maria Wiłkomirska (substitute)
  Yakov Zak ( III)
  Carlo Zecchi
  Jerzy Żurawlew

For the first time, the jury did not sit on the stage, but on the balcony of the auditorium, where it has remained since.

References

Further reading

External links 
 

 

International Chopin Piano Competition
1955 in music
1955 in Poland
1950s in Warsaw